Meshir 17 - Coptic Calendar - Meshir 19

The eighteenth day of the Coptic month of Meshir, the sixth month of the Coptic year. In common years, this day corresponds to February 12, of the Julian Calendar, and February 25, of the Gregorian Calendar. This day falls in the Coptic Season of Shemu, the season of the Harvest.

Commemorations

Saint 

 The departure of Saint Malatius the Confessor, Patriarch of Antioch

Other commemorations 

 The consecration of the Church of Saint Paul the Simple

References 

Days of the Coptic calendar